Xuzhou East railway station (or Xuzhoudong railway station) is a station dedicated for high-speed railways in Xuzhou, Jiangsu, People's Republic of China. It is served by the Beijing–Shanghai high-speed railway and Xuzhou-Lanzhou high-speed railway (Eurasia Continental Bridge passageway).

The new station for high-speed rail services was officially put into use on June 30, 2011. It is located at the approximate halfway point between Beijing and Shanghai on the Beijing-Shanghai railway.

History 
On April 18, 2008, Xuzhou East Station officially began construction. After CRH380A rolling stock tests in December 2010, it opened for high-speed rail traffic on June 30, 2011.

Expansion 
An expansion project for the station was announced by the Xuzhou High-Speed Railway Investment Company in August 2017 to change the east square of the station into an "integrated passenger transportation hub". Groundbreaking on the project is expected to begin by the end of 2018.

The expanded station will include 13 island platforms and 28 tracks, serving roughly 80,000 passengers per day. Total investment in the project is around 1.5 billion renminbi. It was completed on December 16, 2019 with the opening of the Xuzhou-Yancheng high-speed railway.

Metro station 
The station has been served by Line 1 of the Xuzhou Metro since its opening on 28 September 2019.

References 

Railway stations in Jiangsu
Railway stations in China opened in 2010
Stations on the Xuzhou–Lanzhou High-Speed Railway